Sucha Dolna may refer to:
Polish name for Dolní Suchá in the Czech Republic
Sucha Dolna, Łódź Voivodeship (central Poland)
Sucha Dolna, Lubusz Voivodeship (west Poland)